Mecynome quadrispinosus is a species of beetle in the family Cerambycidae. It was described by Franz in 1954. It is known from El Salvador.

References

Parmenini
Beetles described in 1954